The 2021 Kansas City NWSL season was the team's first season as a professional women's soccer team. Kansas City NWSL plays in the National Women's Soccer League, the top tier of women's soccer in the United States. The team rebranded at halftime of its final match to the Kansas City Current.

Background 

Kansas City previously had an NWSL team in 2017, when two-time champions FC Kansas City ceased operations and its player-related assets were transferred to expansion team Utah Royals FC. Three years later, the Royals also had to cease operations, and a Kansas City-based ownership group led by financial executives Angie and Chris Long took advantage to secure an expansion team along with the Royals' player-related assets on December 7, 2020. Brittany Mahomes, wife of Kansas City Chiefs quarterback Patrick Mahomes and former college soccer player at University of Texas at Tyler, purchased a stake in the team as well.

Stadium 
The team began play at 10,385-capacity Legends Field, a baseball park in Kansas City, Kansas, that was home to the Kansas City Monarchs of the American Association of Professional Baseball. However, the team moved its inaugural home match, scheduled for April 26, to Children's Mercy Park due to delays in construction at Legends Field.

Team

Staff 
Upon forming Kansas City NWSL, the Longs immediately named Huw Williams, former general manager of FC Kansas City, as the team's inaugural head coach. The team subsequently named the rest of its staff on January 11, 2021.

Squad 
Upon formation, the NWSL awarded Kansas City NWSL with the player rights, draft picks, and other roster-related assets of the defunct Utah Royals FC, which formed the team's inaugural roster.

Competitions

Challenge Cup

Group stage

West Division standings

Regular season

Matches

Regular season standings

Results summary

Results by matchday

Statistical leaders

Top scorers

Top assists

Shutouts

Awards

NWSL weekly awards

Player of the Week

Save of the Week

Transactions

2021 NWSL Draft 

Draft picks are not automatically signed to the team roster. The 2021 NWSL Draft was held on January 13, 2021. The NWSL awarded Kansas City all of the defunct Utah Royals FC team's player rights and draft picks upon its dissolution.

Transfers in

Transfers out

References 

2021 National Women's Soccer League season
American soccer clubs 2021 season
Kansas City Current
Kansas City Current seasons
2021 in sports in Kansas